The 1969 NHL Amateur Draft was the seventh NHL Entry Draft. It was held at the Queen Elizabeth Hotel in Montreal, Quebec. This draft is notable for being the first NHL draft to be conducted after the league ended direct sponsorship of junior hockey.

The last active players in the NHL from this draft class were Butch Goring and Ivan Boldirev, who both played their last NHL games in the 1984–85 season.

Selections by round
Below are listed the selections in the 1969 NHL amateur draft.

Round one

 The Minnesota North Stars' first-round pick went to the Boston Bruins as the result of a trade on May 7, 1969 that sent Barry Gibbs and Tom Williams to Minnesota in exchange for future considerations (Fred O'Donnell) and this pick.
 The Pittsburgh Penguins' first-round pick went to the Boston Bruins as the result of a trade on May 21, 1968 that sent Pittsburgh's first-round pick and cash to Boston in exchange for Jean Pronovost and John Arbour.
 The Montreal Canadiens' first-round pick went to the Minnesota North Stars as the result of a trade where Minnesota promised Montreal that they would not draft Dick Duff in the 1969 intra-league draft.
Montreal previously acquired this pick as the result of a trade on June 11, 1968 that sent Gerry Desjardins to Los Angeles in exchange for a first-round pick in 1972 and this pick.
 The St. Louis Blues' first-round pick went to the New York Rangers as the result of a trade on June 10, 1969 that sent Phil Goyette to St. Louis in exchange for this pick.

Round two

Round three

Round four

Round five

Round six
Tommi Salmelainen was the first European to be drafted by a National Hockey League team.

 The Los Angeles Kings' sixth-round pick went to the Montreal Canadiens as the result of a trade on June 12, 1969 that sent cash to Los Angeles in exchange for this pick.
 The New York Rangers' sixth-round pick went to the St. Louis Blues as the result of a trade on June 12, 1969 that sent cash to New York in exchange for this pick.

Round seven

 The Pittsburgh Penguins' seventh-round pick went to the St. Louis Blues as the result of a trade on June 12, 1969 that sent cash to Pittsburgh in exchange for this pick.
 The Los Angeles Kings' seventh-round pick went to the Montreal Canadiens as the result of a trade on June 12, 1969 that sent cash to Los Angeles in exchange for this pick.

Round eight

 The Pittsburgh Penguins' eight-round pick went to the Montreal Canadiens as the result of a trade on June 12, 1969 that sent cash to Pittsburgh in exchange for this pick.
 The Los Angeles Kings' eight-round pick went to the St. Louis Blues as the result of a trade on June 12, 1969 that sent cash to Los Angeles in exchange for this pick.

Round nine

Round ten

Draftees based on nationality

See also
 1969–70 NHL season
 List of NHL players

References

External links
 HockeyDraftCentral.com
 1969 NHL Amateur Draft player stats at The Internet Hockey Database

Draft
National Hockey League Entry Draft